Penguin Point is a rock point at the west side of the entrance to Murphy Bay. It was discovered and named in 1912 by the eastern coastal party led by Cecil T. Madigan of the Australasian Antarctic Expedition (1911-14) under Douglas Mawson.

References

Headlands of George V Land